Haplogroup E-M132, formerly known as E-M33 (E1a), is a human Y-chromosome DNA haplogroup. Along with E-P177, it is one of the two main branches of the older E-P147 paternal clade. E-M132 is divided into two primary sub-branches, E-M44 and E-Z958, with many descendant subclades.

Ancient DNA

E-M132/E1a has been found in the remains of one Guanche (1/30) from the Canary Islands, and one Bimbape (1/16) from El Hierro that has been dated to the 10th century CE.

Distribution

E-M132 is found most often in West Africa, and today it is especially common in the region of Mali. One study has found haplogroup E-M132 Y-chromosomes in as much as 34% (15/44) of a sample of Malian men, including 2/44 E-M44 and 13/44 E-M33/M132(xE-M44). In particular, the Dogon people of Mali have been found to carry haplogroup E-M132 with a frequency as high as 45.5% (25/55). This makes it perhaps the most common Y-DNA haplogroup in this population, though haplogroup E-P1 appears to be almost equally frequent among the Dogon (24/55 = 43.6%). Another study has found haplogroup E-M132 in 15.6% (44/282) of a pool of seven samples of various ethnic groups in Guinea-Bissau. Haplogroup E-M132 also has been found in samples obtained from Moroccan Berbers, Sahrawis, Burkina Faso (including E-M33/M132(xE-M44) in 2/20 = 10% Fulbe and 2/37 = 5.4% Rimaibe), northern Cameroon (including E-M44 in 9/17 = 53% Fulbe and E-M33/M132(xE-M44) in 3/15 = 20% Tali), Senegal (7/139 = 5.0%), Ghana (1/29 = 3% Ga, 1/32 = 3% Fante), Sudan (including 5/32 = 15.6% Hausa and 3/26 = 11.5% Fulani), Egypt (1%-1.4%) Calabria (including both Italian and Albanian inhabitants of the region), 1 Italian (from 67 tested) from Trentino in northeastern Italy, and Romanians from Constanţa.

Phylogenetics

Phylogenetic history

Prior to 2002, there were in academic literature at least seven naming systems for the Y-Chromosome phylogenetic tree. This led to considerable confusion. In 2002, the major research groups came together and formed the Y-Chromosome Consortium (YCC). They published a joint paper that created a single new tree that all agreed to use. Later, a group of citizen scientists with an interest in population genetics and genetic genealogy formed a working group to create an amateur tree aiming at being, above all, timely.  The table below brings together all of these works at the point of the landmark 2002 YCC tree. This allows a researcher reviewing older published literature to quickly move between nomenclatures.

Research publications

The following research teams per their publications were represented in the creation of the YCC tree.

Phylogenetic trees

This phylogenetic tree of haplogroup  subclades is based on the YCC 2008 tree and subsequent published research.

 E-P147 (P147)
 E-M132 (M132, L633, M33)
 E-M44 (M44)
 E-L96 (L94)
 E-L133 (L133)

See also

Genetics

Y-DNA E subclades

Y-DNA backbone tree

References

Sources for conversion tables

External links

 Y-DNA Haplogroup E and Its Subclades from ISOGG 2008
 E1b1.org – International Y-DNA project of Haplogroup E1b1 and its Subclades

E